A dummy pronoun is a deictic pronoun that fulfills a syntactical requirement without providing a contextually explicit meaning of its referent. As such, it is an example of exophora.

Dummy pronouns are used in many Germanic languages, including German and English. Pronoun-dropping languages such as Spanish, Portuguese, Chinese, and Turkish do not require dummy pronouns.

A dummy pronoun is used when a particular verb argument (or preposition) is nonexistent (it could also be unknown, irrelevant, already understood, or otherwise "not to be spoken of directly") but when a reference to the argument (a pronoun) is nevertheless syntactically required. For example, in the phrase "It is obvious that the violence will continue", it is a dummy pronoun, not referring to any agent. Unlike a regular pronoun of English, it cannot be replaced by any noun phrase.

The term dummy pronoun refers to the function of a word in a particular sentence, not a property of individual words. For example, it in the example from the previous paragraph is a dummy pronoun, but it in the sentence "I bought a sandwich and ate it" is a referential pronoun (referring to the sandwich).

Dummy subjects

Weather it
In the phrase "it is raining—", the verb to rain is usually considered semantically impersonal, even though it appears as syntactically intransitive; in this view, the required it is to be considered a dummy word.

Other views
However, there have been a few objections to this interpretation. Noam Chomsky has argued that the it employed as the subject of English weather verbs can control the subject of an adjunct clause, just like a "normal" subject. For example, compare:
She brushes her teeth before having a bath.
→ She brushes her teeth before she has a bath.

It sometimes rains after snowing.
→ It sometimes rains after it snows.

If this analysis is accepted, then the "weather it" is to be considered a "quasi-(verb) argument" and not a dummy word.

Some linguists such as D. L. Bolinger go even further, claiming that the "weather it" simply refers to a general state of affairs in the context of the utterance. In this case, it would not be a dummy word at all. Possible evidence for this claim includes exchanges such as:
"Was it nice (out) yesterday?"
"No, it rained."
where it is implied to mean "the local weather".

Raising verbs

Other examples of semantically empty it are found with raising verbs in "unraised" counterparts. For example:

It seems that John loves coffee. (Corresponding "raised" sentence: John seems to love coffee.)

Extraposition

Dummy it can also be found in extraposition constructions in English, such as the following:

It was known to all the class [that the boy failed his test].

Dummy objects
In English, dummy object pronouns tend to serve an ad hoc function, applying with less regularity than dummy subjects. Dummy objects are sometimes used to transform transitive verbs to a transitive light verb form: e.g., do → do it, "to engage in sexual intercourse"; make → make it, "to achieve success"; get → get it, "to comprehend". Prepositional objects are similar: e.g., with it, "up to date"; out of it, "dazed" or "not thinking". All of these phrases, of course, can also be taken literally. For instance:

He ordered a cheeseburger, and even though it took them a while to make it, he did get some French fries with it.

Dummy predicates
It has been proposed that elements like expletive there in existential sentences and pro-forms in inverse copular sentences play the role of dummy predicate rather than dummy subject, so that the postverbal noun phrase would rather be the embedded subject of the sentence.

See also
 Impersonal verb
 Null-subject language

References

Everaert, M. - van Riemsdijk, H - Goedemans, R. (eds) 2006 The Blackwell Companion to Syntax, Volumes I-V, Blackwell, London: see "existential sentences and expletive there" in Volume II.
 Chomsky, Noam (1981) Lectures on Government and Binding. Dordrecht: Foris., cited in http://www.ling.helsinki.fi/sky/julkaisut/SKY2004/Alba-Salas.pdf.
 Bolinger, D. L. (1977). Meaning and form. English Language Series, 11. London: Longman.
 Graffi, G. 2001 200 Years of Syntax. A critical survey, John Benjamins, Amsterdam, The Netherlands.
 Moro, A. 1997 The raising of predicates. Predicative noun phrases and the theory of clause structure, Cambridge Studies in Linguistics, Cambridge University Press, Cambridge, England.

Pronouns
Transitivity and valency